Cycloramphus bandeirensis is a species of frog in the family Cycloramphidae.
It is endemic to Brazil.
Its natural habitats are subtropical or tropical high-altitude grassland and rivers.
It is threatened by habitat loss.

References

bandeirensis
Endemic fauna of Brazil
Amphibians of Brazil
Taxonomy articles created by Polbot
Amphibians described in 1983